Midnight star, star of midnight, or variation, may refer to:

Entertainment
 Star of Midnight, a 1935 U.S. film
 The Midnight Star, a 2016 fantasy novel by Marie Lu
 Midnight Star (band), a U.S. band
 "Midnight Star" (song), a 1984 song by Weird Al Yankovic, off the album "Weird Al" Yankovic in 3-D
 Midnight Star, a series of videogames created by Industrial Toys
 Midnight Star (video game), a 2015 first-person shooter
 Midnight Star: Renegade, a 2016 shooting game

Places
 "The Midnight Star", a notable squat in Sydney, Australia; see Squatting in Australia
 The Midnight Star, Deadwood, South Dakota, USA; a casino

Other uses
 Yamaha Midnight Star, a motorcycle
 Midnight Star, a 116.75-carat ruby in the Harry Frank Guggenheim Hall of Gems and Minerals

See also

 Midnight Sun (disambiguation)
 
 Midnight (disambiguation)
 Star (disambiguation)